Rudy Takala is a conservative writer and Republican politician.

Early life

Takala was born in Rush City, Minnesota and grew up on a dairy farm in neighboring Pine City. Takala was homeschooled for nine years before earning a Bachelor of Arts in legal studies and economics from Hamline University in 2009 at the age of 20. He completed a Master of Arts in political communication from American University.

Education
He received a Bachelor of Arts in legal studies and economics from Hamline University followed by a master's degree in political communication at American University.

Political background

Takala was elected chairman of Minnesota's Pine County Republicans at the age of 18. He was re-elected in 2009 with 60% of the vote, and again in 2011.

In early 2009, Takala announced his decision to run for the Minnesota House of Representatives in House district 8B, which at the time encompassed all of Kanabec County and parts of Pine & Isanti counties.  Takala lost the primary election to Roger Crawford on August 10, 2010, by a 59% to 41% margin.

At the 2012 Minnesota State Republican Convention he was selected as a delegate to the Republican Party's National Convention in Tampa.

Commentator
After running for the Minnesota House, Takala wrote and provided occasional commentary on Minnesota politics. He was often critical of both major political parties for not doing enough to slow the rate of government growth in Minnesota. In 2011, he was quoted by Politics in Minnesota as saying of Republicans in the state legislature, "There was too much talk about the rate of growth [of spending]... we should have been talking about cutting."

He received 1,214 votes at the 2012 Minnesota State Republican Convention to become a delegate to the Republican Party's National Convention in Tampa.

He joined the Washington Examiner in 2015, where he profiled members of Congress including Tom Cotton, Tim Scott, Ron Wyden, Marsha Blackburn, future Secretary of State Mike Pompeo, and Federal Communications Commission Chairman Ajit Varadaraj Pai

As of 2019, he was an opinion editor at Fox News.

Electoral history
2010 Republican primary election for Minnesota House of Representatives – District 8B
 Roger Crawford (R) 59.09% (1,820 votes)
 Rudy Takala (R) 40.91% (1,260 votes)

References

External links
 Column archive at The Washington Examiner
 Column archive at The Hill
 Rudy Takala on Twitter
 Rudy Takala on Muckrack

1980s births
Living people
Minnesota Republicans
People from Pine City, Minnesota
Hamline University alumni
American University School of Public Affairs alumni
American male journalists
Journalists from Washington, D.C.
People from Chisago County, Minnesota